The 2021 Tour of Slovenia was the 27th edition of the Tour of Slovenia stage race that was held from 9 to 13 June 2021. The 2.Pro-category race was initially scheduled to be a part of the inaugural edition of the UCI ProSeries, but after the 2020 edition was cancelled due to the COVID-19 pandemic, it made its UCI ProSeries debut in 2021, while also still being a part of the 2021 UCI Europe Tour. This was second time Tour of Slovenia was participated by Tour de France winner, 2011 by Carlos Sastre and in 2021 by Tadej Pogačar.

Pogačar first took the lead when he attacked on the climb of Svetina, the penultimate climb on stage 2. He proceeded to extend his lead to more than a minute on the way to the finish in Celje. He successfully defended his lead on the final three stages, including finishing second to his teammate, Diego Ulissi, on the queen stage to Nova Gorica. Total sum of prizes was 64,766 €.

Teams 

Four UCI WorldTeams, eight UCI ProTeams, seven UCI Continental teams, and the Slovenian national team made up the twenty teams that participated in the race. , with six riders, was the only team to not field a full squad of seven riders. Of the 139 riders to start the race, 117 finished.

UCI WorldTeams

 
 
 
 

UCI ProTeams

 
 
 
 
 
 
 
 

UCI Continental Teams

 
 
 
 
 
 
 

National Teams

 Slovenia

Route

Stages

Stage 1 
9 June 2021 – Ptuj to Rogaška Slatina,

Stage 2 

10 June 2021 – Žalec to Celje,

Stage 3 
11 June 2021 – Brežice to Krško,

Stage 4 
12 June 2021 – Ajdovščina to Nova Gorica,

Stage 5 
13 June 2021 – Ljubljana to Novo Mesto,

Classification leadership table 

 On stage 2, Jon Aberasturi, who was second in the points classification, wore the red jersey, because first placed Phil Bauhaus wore the green jersey as the leader of the general classification.
 On stage 3, Kenny Molly, who was second in the mountains classification, wore the blue jersey, because first placed Tadej Pogačar wore the green jersey as the leader of the general classification. For the same reason, Rafał Majka wore the blue jersey on stage 5.

Final classification standings

General classification

Points classification

Mountains classification

Young rider classification

Team classification

UCI point ranking

References

External links 

 

2021
Tour of Slovenia
Tour of Slovenia
Tour of Slovenia
Tour of Slovenia